For the 1999 Rugby World Cup qualifiers, the Americas were allocated three places in the final tournament and one place in the repechage.

Eleven teams played in the American qualifiers that were held over four stages from 1996 to 1998.

Round 1

Group 1

|- bgcolor="C0FFC0"
|||1||1||0||0||41–0||3
|-
|||1||0||0||1||0–41||1
|- bgcolor=#ffcccc
|||0||0||0||0||0–0||0
|}
 withdrew from the group.

Group 2

|- bgcolor="C0FFC0"
|||2||2||0||0||76–6||6
|-
|||2||1||0||1||40–47||4
|-
|||2||0||0||2||26–89||2
|}

Round 2

|- bgcolor="C0FFC0"
|||2||2||0||0||100–14||6
|-
|||2||1||0||1||60–71||4
|-
|||2||0||0||2||12–87||2
|}

Round 3

|- bgcolor="C0FFC0"
|||2||2||0||0||63–17||6
|-
|||2||1||0||1||68–26||4
|-
|||2||0||0||2||9–97||2
|}

Round 4
All round 4 matches were held in Buenos Aires, Argentina.

|- bgcolor="C0FFC0"
|||3||3||0||0||161–52||9
|- bgcolor="C0FFC0"
|||3||2||0||1||97–83||7
|- bgcolor="C0FFC0"
|||3||1||0||2||59–99||5
|- bgcolor="#ffffcc"
|||3||0||0||3||31–114||3
|}

Argentina, Canada, and United States qualified for RWC 1999, Uruguay qualified for repechage.

References

1999
Americas
1996 in South American rugby union
1997 in South American rugby union
1998 in South American rugby union
1996 in North American rugby union
1997 in North American rugby union
1998 in North American rugby union